Darcy Robinson (May 3, 1981September 27, 2007) was an Italian/Canadian professional ice hockey defenseman who was a former Pittsburgh Penguins draft pick. Robinson split five seasons between the AHL and ECHL, playing for both Pittsburgh Penguins' affiliates in Wilkes-Barre and Wheeling before joining HC Asiago in 2005.

Death
Robinson started his third season with Asiago HC on September 27, 2007. Less than  minutes into the opening game of the 2007-08 Serie A season vs Ritten-Renon, Robinson collapsed to the ice without being hit, suffering a heart attack. He was pronounced dead before he reached the hospital. The team was informed of Robinson's death with less than 8 minutes left in the game, and the game was suspended. At the time of his death, Robinson was 26 years old.

Serie A would later cancel all of the scheduled games the following night, postponed the match between Asiago and Pontebba two nights later, and all of the games scheduled on the upcoming weekend. The ANSA news agency reported Friday the local prosecutor's office has opened an official inquiry into Robinson's death.

It was later discovered that Robinson had a rare heart condition that factored into his heart attack.

Personal
Robinson held dual citizenship as an Italian/Canadian at the time of his death and was looking to qualify for the Italian national hockey team.

Robinson was one of several members of the Wilkes-Barre/Scranton Penguins to be featured in the documentary Chasing the Dream.

Awards
2001 - Winner, Ed Chynoweth Cup (Red Deer Rebels)
2001 - Winner, Memorial Cup (Red Deer Rebels)

See also
 List of ice hockey players who died during their playing careers

References

External links

1981 births
2007 deaths
Asiago Hockey 1935 players
Canadian ice hockey defencemen
Sportspeople from Kamloops
Italian ice hockey players
Italian people of Canadian descent
Pittsburgh Penguins draft picks
Red Deer Rebels players
Saskatoon Blades players
Serie A (ice hockey) players
Wilkes-Barre/Scranton Penguins players
Wheeling Nailers players
Ice hockey people from British Columbia
Canadian expatriate ice hockey players in Italy